The White Horse Prophecy is the popular name of an influential but disputed version of a statement on the future of the Latter Day Saints (popularly called Mormons) and the United States.
It was given by Edwin Rushton in about 1900, and supposedly made in 1843 by Joseph Smith, Jr., the founder of the Latter Day Saint movement.

The Latter-day Saints, according to Rushton's version, would "go to the Rocky Mountains and... be a great and mighty people," associated in the prophecy's figurative language, with one of the biblical four Horsemen of the Apocalypse in the Book of Revelation.

Smith's supposed original statement predicts that the US Constitution will one day "hang like a thread" but be saved by Latter-day Saints. The embellished version portrays it to be "by the efforts of the White Horse."

On the basis of either Rushton's version or Smith's original statement, some critics of Mormonism and some Mormon folk doctrine enthusiasts hold that Mormons should expect that the US will eventually become a theocracy dominated by the Church of Jesus Christ of Latter-day Saints.

The idea that members of the Church of Jesus Christ of Latter-day Saints will at one or more times take action to save an imperiled  US Constitution has been referenced by numerous Church leaders, but as to the Rushton version of the Prophecy, the Church has stated that "the so-called 'White Horse Prophecy'... is not embraced as Church doctrine; while numerous Mormon fundamentalists continue to preach the doctrine."

Background

Latter-day Saint Church founder Joseph Smith went to Washington, DC, in November 1839 in an unsuccessful attempt to obtain help for his persecuted followers. Pat Bagley of the Salt Lake Tribune wrote that from then on, Smith and his followers "considered themselves the last Real Americans" and "the legitimate heirs of the pilgrims and Founding Fathers," who would be called upon one day to save the US Constitution. Smith is believed to have said in 1840 that when the Constitution hung by a thread, Latter Day Saint elders would step in "on the  white horse" to save the country.

Joseph Smith is said to have made his statement in early May 1843, while the Latter-day Saints were headquartered in Nauvoo, Illinois. One of Smith's associates who heard the statement was Edwin Rushton. The most complete copy of Rushton's version of Joseph Smith's statement is contained in a 1902 diary entry made by John Roberts of Paradise, Utah. That rendering asserted that in his statement, Smith had prophesied that the Mormons "will go to the Rocky Mountains and will be a great and mighty people established there, which I will call the White Horse of peace and safety." Smith added "I shall never go there" and predicted continued persecution by enemies of the church, and he reportedly said, "You will see the Constitution of the United States almost destroyed. It will hang like a thread as fine as a silk fiber.... I love the Constitution; it was made by the inspiration of God; and it will be preserved and saved by the efforts of the White Horse, and by the Red Horse who will combine in its defense." According to the diary, Smith also said that Mormons would send missionaries to "gather the honest in heart from among the Pale Horse, or people of the United States, to stand by the Constitution of the United States as it was given by the inspiration of God." The account quotes Smith as predicting numerous wars involving Great Britain, France, Russia, China, and other countries, and saying that the European nobility "knows that [Mormonism] is true, but it has not pomp enough, and grandeur and influence for them to yet embrace it." He is also reported to have said that a temple that the Latter-day Saints had planned to build in Jackson County, Missouri "will be built in this generation."

In 1844, Smith rejected the platforms of the major candidates for president of the United States and decided to conduct his own third-party campaign which was cut short by his murder on June 27 that year. After a succession crisis in which Brigham Young was accepted as Smith's successor by the majority of the Latter-day Saints, the Mormon migration to the Intermountain West began, under Young's direction, in February 1846.

Disputed authenticity
The authenticity of the White Horse Prophecy is much disputed. Most of its symbolistic content was not attested to during Smith's lifetime but was instead asserted by Rushton many years after Smith's death. Whereas a philosophical kernel in Rushton's version is confirmed by contemporary Church leaders as having been taught by Smith, Rushton's formulation, as a whole, has often been repudiated by the Church over the years since as early as 1918. An analysis of the White Horse Prophesy was included, along with mentions of its questioned authenticity, as an appendix within Prophecy: Key to the Future, by scriptural scholar and lay theologian Duane Crowther in 1962; and, more recently, the Prophecy has been referenced in the writings of speculative theology by the Mormon fundamentalist Ogden Kraut.

In 1918, Joseph F. Smith, president of the Church of Jesus Christ of Latter-day Saints, dismissed the White Horse Prophecy as a "ridiculous story... and a lot of trash that has been circulated about... by two of our brethren who put together some broken sentences from [Joseph Smith] that they may have heard from time to time." In his 1966 book Mormon Doctrine, Latter-day Saint theologian (and later apostle) Bruce R. McConkie wrote, "From time to time, accounts of various supposed visions, revelations, and prophecies are spread forth by and among the Latter-day Saints, who should know better than to believe or spread such false information. One of these false and deceptive documents that has cropped up again and again for over a century is the so-called White Horse Prophecy."

In early 2010, the Church of Jesus Christ of Latter-day Saints issued a statement stating that "the so-called 'White Horse Prophecy' is based on accounts that have not been substantiated by historical research and is not embraced as Church doctrine." Also in 2010, Latter-day Saint historian Don L. Penrod examined significant differences in two early handwritten accounts of the prophecy, noted some words and phrases that were not characteristic of Joseph Smith's speaking style or current in his time, and speculated that Rushton had "in his elderly years recorded some things that [Smith] actually said, mixing in words of his own creation." It additionally noted that "memories of words and events, especially many years later, are often faulty."

Similar statements
Several sources attribute to Smith the idea that the US Constitution would one day hang by a thread, and Church leaders have issued similar warnings about the Constitution.

Brigham Young

In 1855, Brigham Young reportedly wrote that "when the Constitution of the United States hangs, as it were, upon a single thread, they will have to call for the 'Mormon' Elders to save it from utter destruction; and they will step forth and do it."

Orson Hyde
In 1858, Orson Hyde, another contemporary of Smith, wrote that Smith believed "the time would come when the Constitution and the country would be in danger of an overthrow; and... if the Constitution be saved at all, it will be by the elders of Church."

Charles W. Nibley
In 1922, the  Church's fifth presiding bishop, Charles W. Nibley, stated that "the day would come when there would be so much of disorder, of secret combinations taking the law into their own hands, tramping upon Constitutional rights and the liberties of the people, that the Constitution would hang as by a thread. Yes, but it will still hang, and there will be enough of good people, many who may not belong to our Church at all, people who have respect for law and for order, and for Constitutional rights, who will rally around with us and save the Constitution."

Melvin J. Ballard
In 1928, the apostle Melvin J. Ballard of The Church of Jesus Christ of Latter-day Saints remarked that "the prophet Joseph Smith said the time will come when, through secret organizations taking the law into their own hands... the Constitution of the United States would be so torn and rent asunder, and life and property and peace and security would be held of so little value, that the Constitution would, as it were, hang by a thread. This Constitution will be preserved, but it will be preserved very largely in consequence of what the Lord has revealed and what [the Mormons], through listening to the Lord and being obedient, will help to bring about, to stabilize and give permanency and effect to the Constitution itself. That also is our mission."

Joseph L. Wirthlin 
In 1938 Joseph L. Wirthlin second counselor in the Church's Presiding Bishopric in the October 1938 General Conference quoted Brigham Young, and then says, "We see from this prophecy, uttered by a prophet of God that there will yet devolve upon the Priesthood of this Church the responsibility of protecting the rights and the Constitution of our great country."

Then again in general conference in 1941 he says, "If our rights expire in a convulsion, the body politic now being slowly drugged by the opiate of a borrowed prosperity, will suffer a major financial operation, which will cause the death of the world's greatest democracy; and the vultures and the buzzards of some foreign "ism" will be waiting the moment to step in and devour the carcass" and then refers to the Brigham Young prophecy.

J. Reuben Clark
In 1942, J. Reuben Clark, an apostle and a member of the church's First Presidency, said that "You and I have heard all our lives that the time may come when the Constitution may hang by a thread.... I do know that whether it shall live or die is now in the balance." On the Constitution, Clark went on to cite its "free institutions," separation of powers, and the Bill of Rights. He added that "if we are to live as a Church, and progress, and have the right to worship... we must have the great guarantees that are set up by our Constitution."

Ezra Taft Benson
In a 1986 Brigham Young University speech, Ezra Taft Benson, then president of The Church of Jesus Christ of Latter-day Saints, stated, "I have faith that the Constitution will be saved as prophesied by Joseph Smith. But it will not be saved in Washington. It will be saved by the citizens of this nation who love and cherish freedom. It will be saved by enlightened members of this Church – men and women who will subscribe to and abide by the principles of the Constitution."

Dallin H. Oaks
In 2010, Elder Dallin H. Oaks spoke at a Constitution Day Celebration and warned about the importance of preserving the US Constitution. To that end, he claimed that "all citizens—whatever their religious or philosophical persuasion" should maintain several responsibilities regarding the Constitution: understand it, support the law, practice civic virtue, maintain civility in political discourse, and promote patriotism.

Interpretation
Questions on Latter-day Saint attitudes towards the United States government, whether they are considered on their own or as parts of the White Horse Prophecy, have arisen from time to time as prominent church members have become involved in American politics. The White Horse Prophecy has been characterized as "effectively plac[ing] believers on perpetual Red Alert for the Constitution's possible demise" and as admonishing Mormons to "come to the rescue and restore the true Constitution by any means necessary."

Writers such as Richard Abanes and Elaine Wolff have speculated, on the basis of the prophecy, that Mormons expect that the US will eventually become a "Mormon-ruled theocracy divinely ordained to 'not only direct the political affairs of the Mormon community, but eventually those of the United States and ultimately the world'" and that "a Mormon, if he were elected president, would take his orders from Salt Lake City."

Besides many members of the Republican Party, some Democrat church members have also been inspired to run for office by the White Horse Prophecy.

Romney family
In 1967, US presidential candidate George W. Romney said the following on the White Horse Prophecy:  "I have always felt that they meant that sometime the question of whether we are going to proceed on the basis of the Constitution would arise and at this point government leaders who were Mormons would be involved in answering that question." In 2007, US presidential candidate Mitt Romney, George's son, told the Salt Lake Tribune, "I haven't heard my name associated with [the White Horse Prophecy] or anything of that nature.  That's not official church doctrine.... I don't put that at the heart of my religious belief."

Glenn Beck

Conservative media figure Glenn Beck, who joined the Church of Jesus Christ of Latter-day Saints in 1999, has alleged that President Barack Obama "is going to bring us to the verge of shredding the Constitution, of massive socialism." On November 14, 2008, after Obama's election, Beck appeared on Bill O'Reilly's show The O'Reilly Factor and said that "we are at the place where the Constitution hangs in the balance, I feel the Constitution is hanging in the balance right now, hanging by a thread unless the good Americans wake up." Earlier in November, while interviewing US Senator Orrin Hatch of Utah, also a Mormon, Beck had remarked, "I heard Barack Obama talk about the Constitution and I thought, we are at the point or we are very near the point where our Constitution is hanging by a thread." Hatch appeared on Beck's Fox News show in January 2009, and Beck prompted him by declaring, "I believe our Constitution hangs by a thread."

Blogger and religious commentator Joanna Brooks has said that "it is likely that Beck owes his brand of Founding Father–worship to Mormonism.... Many Mormons also believe that Joseph Smith prophesied in 1843 that the US Constitution would one day 'hang by a thread' and be saved by faithful Mormons." Washington Post journalist Dana Milbank has described Beck's views as essentially "White Horse Prophecy meets horsemen of the apocalypse," but Milbank has also observed that the White Horse Prophecy is "actually a fairly benign prophecy. They're talking about restoring law and order and peace and tranquility. It doesn't sound like a violent thing."

Rex Rammell

In 2009, Idaho gubernatorial candidate Rex Rammell announced plans to hold a series of meetings with believing Mormon men, which were to include discussion of the White Horse Prophecy. In response, the Church of Jesus Christ of Latter-day Saints issued a statement that said that the church is "politically neutral" and hoped that "the campaign practices of political candidates would not suggest that their candidacy is supported by or connected to the church."

Rammell later retracted his original plan to limit his meetings to Latter-day Saint men and apologized to "all those citizens who are not members of the LDS faith, who have expressed a sincere interest in attending my meetings and discussing this prophecy and how we can step forward and save the United States Constitution."

See also

 List of prophecies of Joseph Smith
 Mormon folklore
 Theodemocracy

References

Further reading
 
 
 

1843 works
1843 in Christianity
Mormon folklore
Mormonism and politics
Mormonism-related controversies
Prophecy in Mormonism
Works by Joseph Smith